Taoyuan American School (TYAS) is an American international school in Luzhu District, Taoyuan City, Taiwan. (MOE). The school admits students with non-Republic of China passport and serves grades 1–12. It was established on 10 September 2012, and on 10 April 2013 the school established its first opening ceremony. TYAS offers an American-based curriculum. The school has been authorized by the American Institute in Taiwan (AIT) and licensed by the Ministry of Education  Retrieved on 18 February 2016.

Campus
The  campus, adjacent to Kainan University, includes 14 classrooms, art facilities, a computer lab, three science labs, a cafeteria, a music facility, an auditorium that doubles as a lecture theater, a snack bar, and an information technology and library center.

References

External links
 Taoyuan American School

2012 establishments in Taiwan
American international schools in Taiwan
Schools in Taoyuan
Education in Taoyuan City
Educational institutions established in 2012